The Initiative may refer to:

 The Initiative (company), a video game development company based in Santa Monica
 "The Initiative", an episode of Buffy the Vampire Slayer
 Civil War: The Initiative, a comic book branding as well as a one-shot comic book